Mottinger is an extinct town in Benton County, in the U.S. state of Washington.

A post office called Mottinger was established in 1908, and remained in operation until 1951. The community was named after G. H. and Martha Mottinger, early settlers.

References

Ghost towns in Washington (state)
Geography of Benton County, Washington